Mooresville is a village in western Livingston County, Missouri, United States. The population was 98 at the 2020 census.

History
Mooresville was platted in 1860 by W. B. Moore, and named for him. A post office called Mooresville has been in operation since 1860. The village was incorporated in 1874.

Mineral springs, hotel and camp grounds

Medicinal effects of the waters in Mooresville Mineral Springs were reported before 1850 when hogs appeared to develop immunity from cholera after drinking from the springs. A photo of the springs area was published in 1892. The bath house provided a place for patients to bathe in the mineral waters. The spring house, decorated with a large letter "M", was next to it. In the early 20th century a wooden dance floor was installed in the area between the bath house and spring house.

Dr. Theophilus Fiske (1834-1908) operated the Mineral Springs Hotel and Sanitarium across the road from the springs. Patients from virtually every state stayed at the hotel or in rented rooms of nearby residents while seeking relief from stomach ailments. Others came to enjoy the social atmosphere at the White Horse Inn or to camp with their families at the nearby free camp grounds.

Dr. Fiske's brother Nathaniel "Nat" Fiske (1844-1919) lived near uptown in the first house southwest of the depot. Some spare rooms in the house were rented to travelers, and "HOTEL" was painted in large letters on the north side of the house for incoming train passengers to see. A sign shown in a photograph from the time may have been placed on Nat Fiske's hotel for the benefit of travelers interested in going to his brother's hotel in "Springtown". The words "hotel" and "party rates" were probably removed from this sign after Dr. Fiske died and the Mineral Springs Hotel was sold.

Geography
Mooresville is located at  (39.744962, -93.718444).

Demographics

2010 census
As of the census of 2010, there were 91 people, 42 households, and 27 families residing in the village. The racial makeup of the village was 100.0% White.

There were 42 households, of which 19.0% had children under the age of 18 living with them, 50.0% were married couples living together, 7.1% had a female householder with no husband present, 7.1% had a male householder with no wife present, and 35.7% were non-families. 31.0% of all households were made up of individuals, and 16.6% had someone living alone who was 65 years of age or older. The average household size was 2.17 and the average family size was 2.63.

The median age in the village was 49.9 years. 17.6% of residents were under the age of 18; 2.2% were between the ages of 18 and 24; 22% were from 25 to 44; 33% were from 45 to 64; and 25.3% were 65 years of age or older. The gender makeup of the village was 48.4% male and 51.6% female.

2000 census
As of the census of 2000, there were 89 people, 40 households, and 25 families residing in the village. The population density was 489.8 people per square mile (190.9/km). There were 48 housing units at an average density of 264.2 per square mile (103.0/km). The racial makeup of the village was 100.00% White.

There were 40 households, out of which 22.5% had children under the age of 18 living with them, 60.0% were married couples living together, 2.5% had a female householder with no husband present, and 37.5% were non-families. 35.0% of all households were made up of individuals, and 17.5% had someone living alone who was 65 years of age or older. The average household size was 2.23 and the average family size was 2.92.

In the village, the population was spread out, with 22.5% under the age of 18, 5.6% from 18 to 24, 19.1% from 25 to 44, 27.0% from 45 to 64, and 25.8% who were 65 years of age or older. The median age was 48 years. For every 100 females, there were 85.4 males. For every 100 females age 18 and over, there were 81.6 males.

The median income for a household in the village was $21,875, and the median income for a family was $34,250. Males had a median income of $26,250 versus $13,750 for females. The per capita income for the village was $16,282. There were no families and 2.7% of the population living below the poverty line, including no under eighteens and none of those over 64.

References

Villages in Livingston County, Missouri
Villages in Missouri